In taxonomy, Methanocorpusculum is a genus of microbes within the family Methanocorpusculaceae. The species within Methanocorpusculum were first isolated from biodisgester wastewater and activated sludge from anaerobic digestors.  In nature, they live in freshwater environments. Unlike most other methanogenic archaea, they do not require high temperatures or extreme salt concentrations to live and grow.

Nomenclature

The name Methanocorpusculum has Latin roots. It means bodies that produce methane.

Description and metabolism

The cells  of these archaea are small, irregular, and coccoid in shape.  They are Gram-negatives y and not very motile.  They reduce carbon dioxide to methane using hydrogen, but they can also use formate or secondary alcohols. They cannot use acetate or methylamines.  They grow fastest at temperatures of 30–40 °C.

Phylogeny
The currently accepted taxonomy is based on the List of Prokaryotic names with Standing in Nomenclature (LPSN) and National Center for Biotechnology Information (NCBI).

See also
 List of Archaea genera

References

Further reading

Scientific journals

Scientific books

Scientific databases

External links

Archaea genera
Euryarchaeota